Bruno Petković (born 16 September 1994) is a Croatian professional footballer who plays as a striker for Dinamo Zagreb and the Croatia national team.

Early career
Petković was born in Metković, Croatia. His father Jakov Petković hails from Metković and his mother Ruža Nižić is a Herzegovinian Croat from Crveni Grm near Ljubuški. His childhood football idols were Ronaldo and Zlatan Ibrahimović.

He began his youth career with his hometown clubs ONK Metković and NK Neretva, before he went to Dinamo Zagreb in 2007. He remained there until 4 September 2009, when he transferred across town, to the youth academy of city-rivals NK Zagreb. In the next two seasons, he represented NK HAŠK (2010–11) and Hrvatski Dragovoljac (2011–12), prior to his transfer to Italy, with Serie A side, Catania.

Club career

Calcio Catania
On 27 August 2012, Petković officially transferred to Calcio Catania. The transfer fee involved was undisclosed, though Petković was inserted directly into the club's youth academy following his arrival. His first call-up to the senior squad arrived on 27 January 2013, in a 2–1 home victory over Fiorentina in league play. His league debut came on the final matchday of the 2012–13 Serie A campaign, when he appeared as an 89th minute substitute in a 2–2 away draw with Torino. Ahead of the 2013–14 Serie A season, Petković was officially promoted to the first team, and assigned the number 32 jersey.

Trapani and Bologna
In January 2016, Petković moved to Serie B side Trapani. He scored seven goals in the second round of the Serie B season, as the Sicilian team nearly gained promotion to Serie A, failing only in the final play-off match against Pescara. The following season he scored three goals in the first round of the 2016–17 Serie B season. On 12 January 2017 Petković was purchased by Serie A team Bologna, for 1.2 million euros. He made total of 21 Serie A appearances for the team, before being loaned to Hellas Verona on 11 January 2018.

Dinamo Zagreb

2018–19 season
On 6 August 2018, he joined Dinamo Zagreb on a season-long loan with Dinamo holding an obligation to buy his contract out at the end of the loan if certain conditions are met. On 25 August, he scored his first goal for Dinamo in a 1–0 home win over Lokomotiva. As the season wore on, Petković became more important to the squad and played the starring role in the peak of Dinamo Zagreb season, the 2018–19 UEFA Europa League Round of 32 home fixture against Viktoria Plzeň, when he assisted the first goal and scored the third in the 3–0 win. In the Round of 16 home fixture against Benfica he scored the only goal in the 1–0 win. However, Benfica came back beating Dinamo 3–0 at Estádio da Luz after extra time. He finished his first season in the club with 11 goals and 5 assists in 37 matches in all competitions.

2019–20 season
Petković was instrumental to Dinamo Zagreb's successful Champions League qualifying campaign, scoring four goals against Saburtalo Tbilisi home and away, Ferencváros away, and Rosenborg home. His performances earned him a new contract with Dinamo, signed on 13 September 2019, which keeps him in the club until 2024.

He made his Champions League debut on 18 September 2019 in a 4–0 home win over Atalanta and scored his debut goal on 6 November in a 3–3 home draw with Shakhtar Donetsk.

On 17 June 2020, he scored a last minute goal in a 3–2 home victory over Slaven Belupo, the first home game of Dinamo's new coach Igor Jovićević. On 27 June, he suffered an injury in a goalless draw with Osijek that ruled him out for the rest of the season.

2020–21 season
After missing the first Dinamo's game of the season against Lokomotiva due to the injury, Petković returned on 21 August for a game against Istra 1961, coming off the bench and scoring the only goal in the 1–0 victory. During the season, Petković was the target of criticism from the media and fans due to his inconsistency and poor form. However, on 18 February 2021, in the Europa League Round of 32, he scored a brace and provided Luka Ivanušec with a pre-assist for Iyayi Atiemwen's third goal as Dinamo defeated Krasnodar 3–2 away.

2021–22 season
On 30 September 2021, he scored two goals from the penalty spot in a 3–0 away win over Genk in the Europa League.

2022–23 season
On 2 November 2022, he scored a goal in a 2–1 away defeat against Chelsea in the Champions League.

International career
On youth level, he was capped only once for Croatia U21 in a game against Liechtenstein on 13 August 2013, scoring a goal in the 5–0 victory.

On 11 March 2019, he received his first senior Croatia call-up as a replacement for the injured Marko Pjaca. He made his debut on 21 March 2019 in a Euro 2020 qualifier against Azerbaijan. He scored his first goal for the national team on 11 June in a friendly loss to Tunisia.

He turned out to be instrumental to Croatia's successful UEFA Euro 2020 qualifying campaign, scoring four goals and assisting one. He finished the qualifiers as the group's top goalscorer. However, following the tournament postponement due to the COVID-19 pandemic, Petković was heavily criticized for his inefficiency in the national team during Croatia's disappointing 2020–21 Nations League campaign where they managed to win only three points in six games.

In the 2022 FIFA World Cup quarter-final on 9 December, Petković scored the equalizing goal against Brazil to take the game to penalties. It was his first goal for Croatia after 17 caps and more than two years. Croatia won the penalty shootout and progressed to the semi-finals for the third time in their history.

Personal life
On 3 April 2021, Petković and his partner Iva Šarić became parents of a baby boy, whom they named Adrian.

Career statistics

Club

International

Scores and results list Croatia's goal tally first.

Honours 
Dinamo Zagreb
Prva HNL: 2018–19, 2019–20, 2020–21
Croatian Cup: 2020–21
Croatian Super Cup: 2019
Croatia

 FIFA World Cup third place: 2022
Individual
Football Oscar – Best Prva HNL player: 2020, 2021 
Football Oscar – Prva HNL Team of the Year: 2019, 2020, 2021
Tportal Prva HNL Player of the Year: 2019
Croatian First Football League most assist provided: 2019–20, 2020–21
UEFA Europa League Team of the Week: 2020–21 Round of 32
CIES Croatian First Football League Team of the Season: 2021–22

References

External links

Bruno Petković — CFF record
Bruno Petković at Goal.com

1994 births
Living people
Sportspeople from Metković
Croatian footballers
Association football forwards
Croatia under-21 international footballers
Croatia international footballers
Croatian expatriate footballers
Serie A players
Serie B players
Serie C players
Croatian Football League players
NK Neretva players
Catania S.S.D. players
S.S.D. Varese Calcio players
A.C. Reggiana 1919 players
Virtus Entella players
Trapani Calcio players
Bologna F.C. 1909 players
Hellas Verona F.C. players
GNK Dinamo Zagreb players
UEFA Euro 2020 players
2022 FIFA World Cup players
Expatriate footballers in Italy
Croatian expatriate sportspeople in Italy